Utah Tech University (UT), formerly known as Dixie State University (DSU) and similar names, is a public university in St. George, Utah. The university offers about 240 programs (4 master's degrees, 53 bachelor's degrees, 18 associate degrees, 45 minors, 52 certificates/endorsements, and 70 emphases). As of fall 2022, there are 12,556 students enrolled at UT. The student body is 57% female and 42% male with 21% of the student body being minority (non-white) students.

The institution began as St. George Stake Academy, founded in 1911 by the Church of Jesus Christ of Latter-day Saints (LDS Church). Later it became a state school of the Utah System of Higher Education. Until 2000, it was a two-year junior college named Dixie College. In 2000 the institution was renamed Dixie State College. In February 2013 the school officially became Dixie State University. In November 2021, after controversy over the use of the term "Dixie" in the school's name, the state legislature approved the bill that allowed the school to become Utah Tech University. The school started using the name in May 2022, with full usage in July of the same year.

UT's 16 athletic teams compete in NCAA Division I and are collectively known as the Utah Tech Trailblazers. Utah Tech reclassified to Division I in 2019 and joined the Western Athletic Conference (WAC) in the 2020–2021 season. Previously, the Trailblazers competed in NCAA Division II, with the football team being part of the Rocky Mountain Athletic Conference, while the Women's Swimming team competed in the Pacific Collegiate Swim Conference, and the school's 14 other athletic teams competed in the PacWest Conference.

History

The institution was founded by the LDS Church on September 19, 1911, as St. George Stake Academy. The academy, located in a region called "Utah's Dixie" by Brigham Young and local settlers, was renamed to Dixie Academy in 1913 Dixie Normal College in 1916, and Dixie Junior College in 1923. In 1933, the LDS Church discontinued its support of the college, and rather than give up on it, the local citizenry came together and maintained the school's operation through donations and labor for two years.

In 1935, the State Board of Education took over the funding for the school, but wanted to split the college students from the high school students, with the high school moving under the direction of Washington County. The community resisted, feeling that the approximate 200 college students and similar number of high school students needed to be combined to provide a good-sized student body for the many social and academic programs. Another concern was that the county did not have the funds to build a new high school.

Between 1935 and 1963 there were close calls when various state leaders proposed closing the college, but the local citizens were willing to donate to keep it alive. These local citizens, particularly the Dixie Education Association, raised the funds to purchase four blocks of land on 700 East and 100 South for a new campus. They presented that land to the state which, in turn, agreed to fund a few buildings for a new campus there. In 1957, the gymnasium was finished and by 1963 four other buildings were ready for college students with the high school students remaining on the downtown campus. In 1970 the name was changed from Dixie Junior College to Dixie College.

On September 7, 2007, Dixie State College Board of Trustees members announced that Dixie State College of Utah would petition the University of Utah to become the University of Utah–St. George. The proposal was approved by the Dixie State College Board of Trustees on October 7, 2007, and by the University of Utah Board of Trustees on October 14, 2007; however, this did not come to fruition.

In 2011, a bill was drafted for the review of the Utah State Legislature and the Utah State Governor to support Dixie State College's transition to university status.

The institution contracted with a local advertising firm, Sorenson Advertising, to investigate names for the institution as a university and found that alumni overwhelmingly supported the name Dixie while less than half of faculty/staff supported the name Dixie (p. 48). Controversy over the name Dixie has arisen many times. In December 2020, the university's board of trustees unanimously voted to recommend removing the word Dixie from the school's name.

In 2013, the Utah Legislature changed the status of the institution from a college to a university and named it Dixie State University. Governor Gary Herbert signed the bill into law in a ceremony on campus, calling the new university into existence on February 16, 2013. President Stephen Nadauld of Dixie State University and others recognized this step as the fulfillment of the dream of the original Mormon pioneers of the area to have a university for their communities. That same year the Board of Trustees approved a student-driven proposed campus-wide tobacco ban. The ban prohibits all tobacco products, including electronic cigarettes. The ban went into effect on January 1, 2014.

Also in 2013, Dixie State University student Indigo Klabanoff pushed for the creation of a sorority and its financial support. DSU did not approve it or the creation of clubs with Greek letters in their names (excepting honor societies), because they said introducing Greek Life properly requires significant funding and the inherent "partying" stereotype of a Greek system was not a culture they wanted to encourage on campus.

"Dixie" name, Confederacy symbols, and mascot changes
The Dixie College sports teams were called the Rebels starting in 1952 and a Confederate soldier was used as a mascot starting in 1956. Until 1994, the university used the Confederate Battle Flag as a school symbol (and for a time, still used a reminiscent pattern of stripes with stars after dropping it), and the yearbook was called The Confederate. The Salt Lake Tribune described the yearbooks containing "troubling photos, some as late as the early 1990s", in which "White students sing in black face, dress as Confederate soldiers, stage slave auctions and affectionately display the Confederate battle standard."

In 2009, the school dropped its "Rodney the Rebel" mascot and "the Rebels" as the name for the sports teams, renaming the teams to Red Storm, with a bull mascot. The sports team name was eventually changed to Trailblazers with Brooks the Bison as the mascot in 2016.

The process of changing the university's name began in June 2020 during the George Floyd protests in the midst of the 2020–2022 racial unrest and the Black Lives Matter movement. In December 2020, both the university board of trustees and the Utah Board of Higher Education unanimously voted to recommend a name change to the state legislature, which established the name in state law. Although the legislature delegated the task to a committee that collected suggestions and decided on Utah Polytechnic State University, the Dixie board of trustees recommended Utah Tech University after the original proposed name received negative community input. The Utah System of Higher Education voted unanimously to recommend the name change to Utah Tech University which the Utah State Legislature approved with the condition that the main St. George campus will be named the "Dixie Campus" of UT. The name change took effect July 1, 2022.

2014 termination of a professor 
In December 2014, theater professor Varlo Davenport received a notice of dismissal and termination of employment in connection with a student complaint of an alleged assault, but because of his tenured status he was allowed to request a termination appeal hearing as outlined in (then) DSU Policy. A reinstatement petition was started by students that ultimately garnered over 1,400 signatures, and many letters were also sent to the State Board of Regents from the community and faculty members. A faculty review board convened, and after hearing testimony and evidence from both sides, recommended Davenport's reinstatement. In the final review of the hearing evidence and testimony, University President Richard Williams found the faculty review board's recommendation to be contrary to the information presented. He rejected the recommendation and upheld the termination. Members of the faculty review board subsequently met with President Williams, pressing for a change in his decision. They were unsuccessful. The City of St. George filed Class B misdemeanor charges in Justice Court and a trial was held in 2016, with the jury finding the professor not guilty.

2015 accusation of censorship
In 2015, in accordance with school policy, three students requested permission from the university to post fliers with satirical images of former President George W. Bush and revolutionary leader Che Guevara on campus. The university disapproved the request because the fliers violated school policy by mocking people. The three students filed a lawsuit against Dixie State University in federal court, stating that the university violated their Constitutional right to free speech with an overly restrictive and overly vague school policy. Shortly thereafter, President Williams announced that all campus policies that infringed upon free expression and free speech were temporarily rescinded and new directives were being drafted. A few months later, Dixie State University settled the lawsuit with the three plaintiffs involved in the case. The university agreed to pay the students $50,000 total in damages and attorney fees. The university also agreed to revise its speech policies that the three plaintiffs said were restrictive and vague.

Campus
The primary campus of Utah Tech University, known as the Dixie Campus, is in St. George, Utah. The Hurricane Education Center campus extension located in Hurricane, Utah, is 20 minutes to the east. At the center of UT campus is the Encampment Mall, where Mormon pioneers first camped when they arrived in 1861 to settle and grow cotton in the desert.

Utah Tech has also expanded its campus to surrounding communities by adding new community education centers that offer concurrent enrollment and college-level classes. 
 Kanab Center, located at Kanab High School in Kanab, UT. 
 Water Canyon Center, located at Water Canyon High School in Hildale, UT, opened in May 2022.
 Panguitch Center, located at Panguitch High School in Panguitch, UT, opened in September 2022.

The Utah State legislature granted Utah Tech over $55 million in 2022 to build a 120,000 square-foot General Classroom Building which is set to open in fall 2025. The building will have 45 classrooms, 105 faculty offices, and 20 study rooms.

Atwood Innovation Plaza

The Atwood Innovation Plaza on Utah Tech's campus provides resources to students and the St. George community at large for business and idea development. Students and community members have access to free consultations and an incubator workspace through the Business Resource Center, tools to create prototypes and perform small-run manufacturing through the Makerspace, assistance with research, patents, trademarks, and copyrights through Innovation Guidance & Solutions, and help getting businesses off the ground through the Startup Incubator. Since opening, the Atwood Innovation Plaza has helped to submit 195 patents with 100 of those patents being granted along with helping to secure 104 trademarks and 22 copyrights.

Academics

As of June 2021, Utah Tech University offers 242 academic programs, including 4 master's degrees, 53 bachelor's degrees with 70 different emphases, 18 associate degrees, 45 minors, and 52 certificate and endorsement options. On January 26, 2018, the university added its first graduate degree program, a Master of Accountancy.

The university is set to offer its first doctoral degree, a clinical doctorate in occupational therapy, after it was approved by the Utah Board of Higher Education in July 2022. The program is currently being reviewed by the Northwest Commission on Colleges and Universities for final approval. If the program is approved, the first cohort will start in fall 2023 and graduate in spring 2026. 

The university is organized into seven academic colleges:
 College of the Arts
 College of Business
 College of Education
 College of Health Sciences
 College of Humanities and Social Sciences
 College of Science, Engineering, and Technology
 University College

Polytechnic academic model

In 2016, Utah Tech made the decision to pivot towards becoming a comprehensive polytechnic university. A polytechnic model was selected because it relies on the university’s instructional model of “active learning. active life,” that focuses on career preparation and engagement in regional economic and workforce growth and development. UT specializes in three core principles of a polytechnic university, including active and applied student learning, student career preparation and development, and industry collaboration.

Booth Honors Program

The mission of the Booth Honors Program at Utah Tech is to “attract a diverse community of highly capable and motivated individuals who challenge one another in a lifelong pursuit of learning.” The Honors Program allows students access to priority registration, scholarship opportunities that provide students with research and travel grants, and small, discussion formatted classes that cover a wide range of topics, like HON 3010: Science and Nature Writing or HON 3010: Super Heroes and Citizenship. Students involved in the Honors Program are also granted access to an exclusive honors space in the Holland Centennial Commons, which serves as a spot for students to study, read, meet and socialize with other Honors students.

Student life
Utah Tech University's Student Association (UTSA) is a federated student administrative body overseeing the functions, funding, and promotion of official student organizations. Executive and legislative power is primarily vested in an elected Executive Council, the President's Cabinet, and the Student Senate. Student clubs interact with the UTSA governing bodies primarily through non-elected Club Representatives. Club Representatives work on behalf of the following organizational categories: Academic Clubs, Student Organizations, Non-Traditional Clubs, Multicultural and Diversity Clubs, Health Science Clubs, and Athletic and Recreation Clubs. All Executive Council members and most Managers receive some sort of financial aid in return for their work.

Various responsibilities fall to UTSA including the planning of most on-campus events, charity and service work, and relations between university students and the school's faculty and surrounding community. Any student is able to apply for any position in UTSA, and if chosen is asked to maintain good academic and community standing, while abiding by the university's other rules and bylaws.

The UTSA Inter-Club Council (ICC) comprises all the university club presidents and UTSA's Club Council. ICC meetings are held bi-weekly and club presidents are encouraged to attend.

Utah Tech University has over 85 clubs for students to join, including the Hiking Club, Japanese Culture Club, Trailgazers Astronomy Club, and the Healthy Trailblazers Coalition.

Housing

Utah Tech provides students with single student and family student housing options. Single student housing includes Campus View Suites I, Campus View Suites II, Abby Apartments, and Chancellor Apartments. Family student housing includes Tech View Apartments and Morgan Apartments. Campus View Suites I & II offer students access to a fitness room, community kitchens, a basketball court, a pickleball court, a sand volleyball court, barbecue areas, a hammock garden and Brooks’ Stop Grill & Market. Campus View Suites III is set to open in fall 2024 to accommodate the growing student population.

Outdoor recreation
With 300 days of sunshine, an average temperature of 77 degrees, and 0 annual inches of snowfall, outdoor recreation is a popular student activity at Utah Tech, with many participating in activities like hiking, rock climbing, and biking. The university is a 50-minute drive from Zion National Park, a 2-hour drive from Bryce Canyon National Park, and a 20-minute drive from Snow Canyon State Park.

Greek Life
Students of Utah Tech University started a chapter of the Kappa Sigma Fraternity, the first official fraternity in the Saint George area in 2019, and has since been operational.

Athletics

Utah Tech University competes in NCAA Division I as a full member of the Western Athletic Conference (WAC). Previously, Dixie played in the Intermountain Collegiate Athletic Conference. The teams are collectively known as the Utah Tech University Trailblazers (new Trailblazers nickname for then DSU was unveiled on April 11, 2016.) Ken Beazer serves as Executive Director of Intercollegiate Athletics and is in his first year replacing former director Jason Boothe. During Boothe's his first seven years at the helm, (then) DSU continued to establish itself as a powerful NCAA Division II program as it experienced high levels of success both on and off the courts and fields. In July 2020, Dixie State began the multi-year reclassification process to NCAA Division I. The Trailblazers began competition against Division I opponents in the 2020–21 season in the WAC, though the football program competed as a FCS independent for a single season, as the WAC re-established sponsorship of Football.

The Trailblazers have won 16 PacWest Championships, 5 PacWest Community Engagement Awards, and have appeared in 34 NCAA Division II tournaments. The men's basketball team appeared in the sweet sixteen in 2011 and the women's volleyball appeared in 2014. The women's softball team has appeared in the College World Series three times and finished as runner up of the 2015 College World Series. The athletic department as a whole has completed 8,500 hours of community service since 2010 and held a grade point average of 2.97 during the 2016–2017 academic year.

The Trailblazers compete in: 

Football
Basketball
Soccer
Baseball
Softball
Swimming
Tennis
Cross Country
Volleyball
Distance Track

The Trailblazers' mascot is Brooks the Bison, who made his first appearance on September 1, 2016, during half-time at the Fall 2016 football season-opener against New Mexico Highlands in Greater Zion Stadium (formerly known as Legend Solar Stadium). The football team went on to win that game, marking its first season-opening win since August 2009. The mascot is named after the first student in the institution's history, Samuel Brooks, who slept on the steps outside what was then St. George Stake Academy to be the first to pay the $10 tuition the next morning. The descended family of Samuel Brooks sat in the stands and was recognized when Brooks the Bison first arrived in the stadium. 
The Utah Tech student section is called "The Stampede" and is run by the Utah Tech Student Association.

The Trailblazers soccer team, won the PacWest 2016 championship by going 13–0, for the first time in school history. They also earned 11 PacWest Postseason Honors.
Bradley Tella earned Goalkeeper of the year, and Bryan Baugh was named First team all-conference.

Athletic facilities
The Trailblazers football, soccer, and track and field teams compete in Greater Zion Stadium, formerly known as Hansen Stadium, and shortly known as Legend Solar Stadium. On April 29, 2016, Legend Solar announced it a donation of $10 million in cash and trade toward the renovation of DSU's stadium. The west grandstand was previously named "Hansen Grandstand" in honor of the George T. Hansen family, who funded the construction of the stadium in the 1980s and who support the renaming and renovation of Legend Solar Stadium. In April 2018, Legend Solar and Dixie State parted ways due to financial troubles for the solar company. As of January 2020, the Dixie State stadium is now known as "Greater Zion Stadium" since the school reached an agreement with Washington County, Utah that included naming rights for the stadium as well as planned expansions to UT's athletic facilities. The stadium name comes from the branding of the county's tourism promotion agency as the Greater Zion Convention and Tourism Office.

The planned renovations include the construction of an east grandstand (completed in 2019); an addition to the top of the west grandstand for banquet rooms, executive boxes, and new press box (completed in 2022); a renovation below the west grandstand to create new locker rooms and training facilities (in progress as of October 2020); a new scoreboard and video board (completed in October 2020) and the installation of solar panels and a 1,500-kilowatt system in the stadium and throughout UT's campus.

The Trailblazers basketball teams play in the Burns Arena, named after Dixie alumnus and donor M. Anthony Burns. The arena contains over 4,700 permanent seats, and recently underwent multiple upgrades, including adding a new large-scale video board and scoreboard hanging above mid-court (funds donated by Mountain America Credit Union).

UT's women's volleyball plays in the Old Gymnasium, located in the Student Activities Center. The Old Gymnasium has seating for just under 1,500 spectators, and offers close, intimate views from nearly every seat.

Utah Tech University baseball has called Bruce Hurst Field their home since 1994. Named after St. George native and former Major League pitcher Bruce Hurst, the stadium has seen its share of great teams in both the junior college and NCAA Division II ranks. The field features a natural grass surface in the infield and outfield. Fences are 12 feet high from the foul poles to the batter's eye in center, which extends to 20 feet high. Hurst Field sits 2,500 capacity, with a reserved section of seats in the main seating bowl. Nine field-level boxes were added in 2008 right behind home plate to complement four boxes just beyond the first base dugout. The complex also hosts multiple high school baseball tournaments and summer league games.

Utah Tech University softball has called Karl Brooks Field its home since construction of the Cooper Diamonds. The field has played home to multiple runs for the Trailblazers toward Pacific West Conference and Rocky Mountain Athletic Conference championships. The complex hosted the 2009 West Regional and Super Regional during DSU's run to the Division II College Softball Championships.

Utah Tech University women's swim team competes in the Human Performance Center which holds a 50-meter Olympic-sized swimming pool, grandstands that can hold a capacity of 750 attendees, a large-scale video board, 2 movable bulk heads, two 3-meter and two 1-meter diving springboards, and a 20-person spa. The Human Performance Center also houses a multi-story gym, multiple basketball courts, an indoor soccer court, a large climbing wall, pickleball courts, indoor/outdoor running track, classrooms and labs, and more.

Utah Tech University golf teams call Entrada Golf Course their home. The off-campus course is known for its breathtaking scenery due to its location near Snow Canyon State Park.

Utah Tech's tennis team plays at the Utah Tech Tennis Courts. Their old courts were demolished in 2018 to make room for the construction of the Human Performance Center and a larger parking lot. The new courts were constructed in place of an old parking lot just a block West of campus.

The Frank Habibian Wrestling and Athletic Center was constructed in 2010 and houses a 6,400-square-foot weight training facility for UT student-athletes, along with 4,800 square feet dedicated to youth and college club wrestling. In addition, the Habibian Center houses locker-room facilities for the men and women soccer teams, two coaches' offices, and one classroom.

Utah Tech Athletics recently entered into a five-year partnership with dōTERRA to create the dōTERRA Nutrition Center. The center will be located next to UT's weight training facility in the Habibian Athletic Center and will provide student-athletes with the nutritional resources they need to compete at the Division I level.

Notable alumni
 Mike Affleck, professional football player
 Nolan D. Archibald, CEO of Black & Decker
 Sark Arslanian, former football coach at Dixie Junior College, Weber State University and Colorado State University
 Jerry Atkin, founder and CEO of SkyWest, Inc.
 John Moses Browning, developed firearms in the 1900s
 Rick Baird, member of the U.S. bobsled team, 1998–2003
 Maurice Baker, professional basketball player
 Marcus Banks, professional basketball player
 Juanita Brooks, historian
 Josh Burkman, former football player who earned JUCO All-American honors, current mixed martial artist formerly with World Series of Fighting and UFC
 M. Anthony Burns, CEO of Ryder, 1983–2000
 Howard W. Cannon, U.S. Senator from Nevada, 1959–1983
 Corey Dillon, professional football player
 Bruce C. Hafen, LDS Church leader, president of Ricks College, 1978–1985
 Cresent Hardy, Nevada State Assemblyman and member of the United States House of Representatives, 2015–2017
 Jeffrey R. Holland, president of Brigham Young University 1980–1989; apostle of the LDS Church 1994–present
 Lionel Hollins, professional basketball player and head coach
 Wendy Horman, Idaho State Representative, 2012–current
 Bruce Hurst, professional baseball player
 Brandon Kintzler, professional baseball player
 Brandon Lyon, professional baseball player
 Reno "Junior" Mahe, professional football player
 Anton Palepoi, professional football player
 Kris Paronto, US Army Ranger, CIA contractor
 Gregory Prince, pathology researcher and Mormon historian
 Raven Quinn, Musician, singer, songwriter
 Neil Roberts, basketball player and coach
 Dave Rose, Brigham Young University men's basketball head coach, 2005–2019
 Junior Siavii, professional football player
 Barry Sims, professional football player
 Brad Thompson, professional baseball player and member of 2006 World Series Champion St. Louis Cardinals
 John "Cat" Thompson, professional basketball player and member of the Naismith Basketball Hall of Fame 
 Scott Young, professional football player

See also
Dixie Rotary Bowl
List of name changes due to the George Floyd protests
Southern Utah International Documentary Film Festival

References

External links

 
 Utah Tech Athletics website

 
Educational institutions established in 1911
Universities and colleges accredited by the Northwest Commission on Colleges and Universities
Buildings and structures in St. George, Utah
Universities and colleges formerly affiliated with the Church of Jesus Christ of Latter-day Saints
Public universities and colleges in Utah
Education in Washington County, Utah
1911 establishments in Utah